Hovhannes Varderesyan (born 12 February 1989) is an Armenian Greco-Roman wrestler.

He started wrestling in 1996. Varderesyan won a bronze medal at the 2006 Cadet European Championships and a bronze medal at the 2009 Junior World Championships.

Varderesyan was a member of the Armenian Greco-Roman wrestling team at the 2010 Wrestling World Cup. The Armenian team came in third place.

He competed at the 2012 Summer Olympics in the men's Greco-Roman 66 kg division. Varderesyan was defeated by eventual gold medalist Kim Hyeon-Woo.

References

External links
 

1989 births
Living people
Sportspeople from Yerevan
Armenian male sport wrestlers
Olympic wrestlers of Armenia
Wrestlers at the 2012 Summer Olympics
21st-century Armenian people